The 1969 Baltimore Colts season was the 17th season for the team in the National Football League. The Colts finished the National Football League's  season with a record of 8 wins, 5 losses and 1 tie. Led by seventh-year head coach Don Shula, Baltimore finished second in the Western Conference's Coastal division, well behind the Los Angeles Rams (11–3).

Many attributed the disappointing season to the hangover of losing to the heavy-underdog New York Jets in Super Bowl III in January 1969. It is one of the first instances of a Super Bowl hangover – in which the team that played in a Super Bowl the previous season, underperforms the next season.

Two months after the season, Shula departed in February 1970 for the Miami Dolphins,

NFL/AFL draft

Personnel

Staff/coaches

Roster

Regular season

Schedule

Season summary

Week 1 vs Rams

Standings

See also 
History of the Indianapolis Colts
Indianapolis Colts seasons
Colts–Patriots rivalry

References

Baltimore Colts
1969
Baltimore Colts